Paris Saint-Germain Football Club, an association football team based in Paris, is the joint-most decorated French team in international club competitions. The Red and Blues have won two international titles: the UEFA Cup Winners' Cup in 1996 and the UEFA Intertoto Cup in 2001. In addition, they were runners-up in the 1996 UEFA Super Cup, the 1996–97 UEFA Cup Winners' Cup and the 2019–20 UEFA Champions League. Their Cup Winners' Cup victory makes PSG the sole French side to have won this trophy as well as one of only two French clubs to have won a major European competition and the youngest European team to do so.

The Parisians first participated in international competitions in the 1982–83 season, when they qualified for the now-defunct Cup Winners' Cup as Coupe de France winners. They made their European debut against Lokomotiv Sofia in the first round on 15 September 1982, and went on to reach the quarter-finals, being eliminated by Waterschei Thor. PSG then debuted in the UEFA Europa League in the 1984–85 campaign before taking their first steps in Europe's premier club competition, the UEFA Champions League in the 1986–87 season.

Between 1992 and 1997, the club appeared in five semi-finals in a row; three in the Cup Winners' Cup, one in the Champions League and another in the UEFA Cup. They claimed their maiden European trophy in 1996, defeating Rapid Wien in the Cup Winners' Cup final. This triumph allowed Paris to dispute the UEFA Super Cup in early 1997, succumbing to Juventus. They reached a second consecutive Cup Winners' Cup final in 1997, this time losing to Barcelona. Considered a minor competition, PSG played in the extinct Intertoto Cup once. They did so in 2001, clinching their second and last continental trophy to date over Brescia on away goals in the two-legged final.

PSG had to wait 19 years to play in another final. Led by an array of stars including record appearance maker Marco Verratti and top scorer Edinson Cavani, the club has qualified for UEFA competitions every season since 2010–11. They reached their first UEFA Champions League final in 2020, falling to a narrow defeat at the hands of Bayern Munich. Therefore, Luis Fernandez remains the only manager ever to achieve European success with Paris, having led them to both the Cup Winners' Cup and Intertoto titles. Likewise, Argentinian forward Lionel Messi is the only player in PSG history to have won the Ballon d'Or. He received it in 2021 for his performances that year.

History

Overview
Paris Saint-Germain had not yet been founded when most of the official international club competitions were first played in the 1960s. They were established in 1970 and had to wait until 1982 to make their European debut in the extinct UEFA Cup Winners' Cup. Thereafter, the Parisians have also participated in the UEFA Champions League, the UEFA Europa League, the UEFA Super Cup and the defunct UEFA Intertoto Cup. As PSG have never won the Champions League, they never played in the former Intercontinental Cup, nor have been able to partake in its successor, the FIFA Club World Cup. The capital side have also never played in the UEFA Europa Conference League, the first edition of which took place in 2021.

First steps in European football (1982–91)
Paris Saint-Germain won their first major title, the Coupe de France, in 1982. This success opened PSG the doors to Europe for the first time in their history, claiming a place in the 1982–83 European Cup Winners' Cup. It was also a first for a Parisian club since the 1960s. The expectation was huge and PSG strengthened their squad with European Golden Shoe winner Kees Kist, 1978 FIFA World Cup champion Osvaldo Ardiles and, most notably, Yugoslav wizard Safet Sušić, who remains to this day one of the club's greatest players ever. They joined an already well-rounded workforce, with experienced players Dominique Bathenay, Dominique Baratelli, Dominique Rocheteau, Mustapha Dahleb and Nambatingue Toko as well as promising academy youth products Luis Fernandez, Jean-Claude Lemoult and Jean-Marc Pilorget.

The Parisians made their European debut in the first round against Lokomotiv Sofia in Bulgaria. Deprived of playmaker Dahleb, they were lucky to walk away with a narrow 1–0 defeat. At the Parc des Princes, Georges Peyroche's men dominated from start to finish but found themselves on the verge of being eliminated when Lokomotiv cancelled Toko's goal right after the break. They now had to score two more goals. Bathenay quickly gave back the lead to a PSG side which had to wait until the last ten minutes to seal their dramatic qualification to the second round. Toko seized a cross from Pascal Zaremba to net a superb half volley before Michel N'Gom and Lemoult killed off any hope of a comeback from the visitors (5–1).

Following a comfortable victory over Swansea City, the quarter-final draw appeared to be perfect as Paris avoided top teams like Real Madrid, Barcelona, Bayern Munich or Inter Milan. The first leg against Belgian Cup winners Waterschei was the club's first major European meeting, reflected in the 49,575 fans present at the Parc, their all-time attendance record. PSG deservedly won 2–0 with a great performance from Luis Fernandez, who scored the first goal. The result could have been larger, though, a fact they would regret. In the return leg, Paris lost 3–0 after extra time and were knocked out in a highly controversial match that saw them finish with nine men.

Led by star player Safet Sušić, the Red and Blues once again qualified for the 1983–84 European Cup Winners' Cup after successfully defending their French Cup title in 1983. They faced Northern Irish minnows Glentoran in the first round, winning 4–2 on aggregate to meet Michel Platini's Juventus. It was the first time PSG played against a big European club as well as the first of several memorable games against the Italian team. PSG rose to the occasion, drawing both matches and only bowing out on away goals to the eventual winners. They were really close to eliminating Juve in the return leg in Turin, with a free-kick from Sušić hitting the post and Pilorget missing a clear chance just before the final whistle.

The capital club's next three European adventures would be less glorious. After brushing away Heart of Midlothian in their UEFA Cup debut in 1984–85, they were shocked by surprise finalists Videoton in the second round. A blushing 4–2 defeat at the Parc was followed by a second leg which saw the Hungarians win twice. With the home side leading 2–0, the match was cancelled due to heavy fog. Paris had a second chance but even a replay could not save them and Videoton triumphed again 1–0. PSG's premiere in the European Cup was even worse. Fresh from being crowned French champions, they fell at the first hurdle to major underdogs Vítkovice in 1986–87. Finally, PSG put up a bittersweet performance in the 1989–90 UEFA Cup. They barely defeated lowly Finish outfit Kuusysi in the first round but were then just one goal away from eliminating eventual champions Juventus in the second round.

Canal+ takeover, semi-final curse (1991–95)

The takeover by Canal+ in 1991 revitalised Paris Saint-Germain, allowing them to become one of the richest clubs in France. PSG named Artur Jorge, famous for winning the 1986–87 European Cup with Porto, as team coach and signed international stars Raí, Ricardo, Valdo and George Weah as well as proven French players Laurent Fournier, Bernard Lama, Vincent Guérin and David Ginola. PSG's continental ascent began in the 1992–93 UEFA Cup, battling their way into the quarter-finals against PAOK, Napoli and Anderlecht before being paired with Real Madrid. In the first leg, Paris fell to a 3–1 defeat at the Santiago Bernabéu and had one foot out the door.

Cheered on by an electric Parc des Princes crowd, however, PSG managed the biggest comeback in their history. They were 3–0 up in added time with goals from George Weah, David Ginola and Valdo, when the Spanish side pulled one back, momentarily forcing extra time. Immediately after, Paris were given a dangerous free kick and Valdo's subsequent 96th-minute cross met the header of Antoine Kombouaré who sent his team to their first semi-finals ever (4–1). This goal earned Kombouaré legend status amongst supporters and the nickname "Gold Helmet." PSG's last-eight victory over Madrid is considered one of the competition's best-ever ties.

Unfortunately, PSG's fairy tale ended in the last four against eventual winners Juventus. Despite Paris taking the lead with a crucial away goal from George Weah after a genius assist from his partner in crime, David Ginola, it was Roberto Baggio the real star of the show, scoring Juve's all three goals in their 3–1 aggregate triumph. An inspired performance by goalkeeper Michelangelo Rampulla and the referee's refusal to award a blatant penalty over Weah in the second leg were also key contributors to PSG's demise.

History would repeat itself in the 1993–94 European Cup Winners' Cup. PSG beat Real Madrid in the quarter-finals, becoming in the process the first and, so far, only French team to win at the Bernabéu with a solitary goal from George Weah, but were denied at the gates of the final once again. Having drawn 1–1 at home to Arsenal, the Parisians needed to score in London yet, surprisingly, Artur Jorge decided to leave Weah in the stands, from where he watched his team lose (0–1). It marked the end of Jorge and his conservative style of play. In his place, the club welcomed Luis Fernandez, who guided PSG to one of the best campaigns in their history.

Drawn into a deadly Group B, alongside Bayern Munich, Spartak Moscow and Dynamo Kyiv, the Red and Blues became one of only seven teams to have won all six group games. Most notably, PSG's 1–0 success away to Bayern saw George Weah dribble past three defenders before lashing the ball into the top corner of Oliver Kahn's net. To this day, Weah's wonder goal is considered one of the most beautiful in the tournament's history. Paris then ousted Johan Cruyff's Barcelona 'Dream Team' to reach their first UCL semi-finals. They mounted a memorable comeback, Raí and Vincent Guérin cancelling Barca's opener to take them through as 3–2 aggregate victors. However, luck ran out against Milan in the first leg at the Parc des Princes. The Rossoneri scored a late winner minutes after a strike from David Ginola had hit the crossbar. Milan were untroubled in the return leg and clinched a 2–0 victory, burying PSG's European dream.

Cup Winners' Cup title under Luis Fernandez (1995–96)

Frustration surrounded the players, manager Luis Fernandez and president Michel Denisot as the team came from three European semi-final losses in a row. Motivated by being so close to glory, the club signed future world champion Youri Djorkaeff, last season's Division 1 top scorer Patrice Loko and a defender who would turn out to be the unexpected hero: Bruno Ngotty. They joined a talented squad which already boasted Brazilian club idol Raí, Panamanian forward Julio Dely Valdés and French midfielder Vincent Guérin.

PSG began the 1995–96 UEFA Cup Winners' Cup steamrolling past Molde and Celtic in the opening two rounds with an aggregate scoreline of 10–2. In the quarter-finals, they were pitted against Parma, the favourites to take the trophy home. They were the super team nobody wanted to face, with legendary players such as Dino Baggio, Fernando Couto, Gianfranco Zola, Fabio Cannavaro, Filippo Inzaghi and Hristo Stoichkov. Indeed, Parma were the only side able to defeat the Parisians that season, thanks to a solitary strike from Stoichkov in Italy. But PSG were not daunted. Two penalties from Raí and one more goal from Loko downed Parma 3–1 in front of a packed Parc des Princes to reach a fourth consecutive European semi-final.

Spanish outfit Deportivo La Coruña, the famous Super Dépor side, awaited in the last four. Led by Welsh coach John Toshack on the bench and by Mauro Silva, Bebeto, Miroslav Djukic and Donato on the field, they were another contender for the ultimate prize. Djorkaeff, injured, was not a starter in a tight first leg. But Fernandez brought him in with five minutes to go and he scored the only goal of the game in Galicia. PSG then repeated the feat in Paris with a lone strike from Loko. The semi-final curse had been broken and the club's first European final was a reality. Austrian club Rapid Wien was the rival in the decisive match. They were the surprise package of the season, eliminating the likes of Sporting CP, Dynamo Moscow and Feyenoord.

There was, however, a lot of pressure to succeed after years of near misses. Seeing this situation, Denisot hired former French tennis player Yannick Noah as motivational coach. It would prove to be a master stroke as PSG captain Bernard Lama later admitted. With renewed energy, Paris seemed unstoppable on that Wednesday night of May 8, 1996, in front of the 37,500 spectators present at the King Baudouin Stadium in Brussels. Not even the injury of star player Raí, replaced by Dely Valdés early in the game, slowed them down against an underperforming Rapid side. With Djorkaeff pulling the strings, PSG created chance after chance until the only goal of the match finally arrived on the half-hour mark. Djorkaeff touched a free-kick to his right and Ngotty let fly a powerful low shot from thirty meters. The ball took a slight deflection off a defender, deceiving Rapid's goalkeeper before hitting the back of the net.

The wait was over; Paris had become only the second French club to clinch a major European tournament after Le Classique arch-rivals Olympique de Marseille's triumph in the 1992–93 UEFA Champions League. This victory also made PSG the youngest European champion in history at barely 25 years of existence. Since the Parisian conquest in 1996, no French team has been able to lift another big continental trophy. Three years later, UEFA scrapped the Cup Winners' Cup, leaving PSG as the sole French side ever to win the competition.

Super Cup nightmare, Cup Winners' Cup runners-up (1996–2000)

With Ricardo replacing Luis Fernandez as manager, UEFA Cup Winners' Cup champions Paris Saint-Germain faced UEFA Champions League winners Juventus in the 1996 UEFA Super Cup. The Bianconeri proved too strong, confirming their status as PSG's bête noire. They effectively ended the contest in the first leg, hitting six goals at the Parc des Princes (1–6). Juve scored inside five minutes and entered the dressing room with a 0–4 lead. Raí converted a penalty eight minutes into the second half but Laurent Fournier's dismissal shortly after dashed any hopes of a comeback for the French side. Two further late goals from the visitors completed the rout. Again, Juventus imposed themselves in Italy to round out a nightmarish 9–2 aggregate defeat for PSG.

The Red and Blues showed that this result had only been an accident by going all the way to the 1997 UEFA Cup Winners' Cup Final four months later. PSG lost 4–2 to Galatasaray in Istanbul but turned it around with a 4–0 victory in the French capital to reach the quarter-finals. After conceding a goalless home draw to AEK Athens, a hat-trick by Patrice Loko earned them a 3–0 win in Greece. PSG then crushed Liverpool in Paris, taking a 3–0 first-leg lead to England which appeared to have sealed their spot in the final. They, however, had to hang on by finger-tips as Liverpool were incredibly close to a comeback in their 2–0 win at Anfield.

In the final, PSG met Barcelona, a side managed by prominent English manager Bobby Robson and featuring a star-studded line-up led by Luís Figo and Ronaldo. Played at the Feijenoord Stadion in Rotterdam, the match saw Paris suffer the UEFA Cup Winners' Cup jinx, becoming the eighth team to reach a second consecutive final and lose it. In the 38th minute, Ronaldo was brought down inside the area by Bruno Ngotty, the hero of PSG's win last season. Ronaldo handled penalty duties himself and coolly fired in past Bernard Lama. PSG went all out for the equaliser but, despite stifling the opposition and hitting the woodwork through Loko in the second half, it wasn't enough.

PSG opened their 1997–98 UEFA Champions League season by facing Steaua București in the second qualifying round, with the winner entering the group stage. In the first leg, after leading twice, Paris lost 3–2 in Romania. Their chances were further hampered when UEFA sanctioned PSG with a 3–0 loss for fielding suspended player Laurent Fournier. This administrative mistake now meant that Paris had to win the return match by a four-goal margin. Thankfully, an inspired Leonardo, who was playing his last game for the club, guided PSG to one of their finest European nights ever. He assisted four of the five unanswered goals that Paris put past Steaua at the Parc des Princes (5–0).

The exploit would be anecdotical, though, as Paris were cruelly eliminated in the group stage. Juventus scored a late winner in their Group B match to render PSG's victory over Beşiktaş in Group E useless and advance to the quarter-finals as second best group runners-up. Both teams finished with 12 points but Juve had a superior goal difference (+4 to +1). They suffered a similar fate in their next European outing. Having earned a spot in the 1998–99 UEFA Cup Winners' Cup as domestic cup champions, PSG were humiliated by lowly Maccabi Haifa in the first round. Shocked in Paris, where a defensive lapse allowed Haifa to snatch a precious 1–1 draw, PSG were eliminated by a 90th-minute buzzer-beater in the return leg (3–2).

Return of Luis Fernandez and Intertoto champions (2000–03)
The 2000–01 UEFA Champions League saw Paris Saint-Germain record two of the most famous yet contrasting results in the competition's history. In the first group stage, PSG became the first team to score seven goals in a match when they crushed Rosenborg 7–2 at the Parc des Princes. The nine-goal aggregate, which included a brace from Nicolas Anelka, was also a record at the time. Then, in the second group stage, Paris suffered a comeback at the hands of Deportivo La Coruña, which became only the second side to recover from three goals down to win. The Red and Blues, leading 0–3 in Spain after 55 minutes through Jay-Jay Okocha and Laurent Leroy (twice), crashed out following Walter Pandiani and Diego Tristán's heroics for Dépor (4–3).

PSG immediately bounced back and clinched their second European title, the UEFA Intertoto Cup, in the summer of 2001. This was the club's first and only participation in this minor competition, abolished by UEFA in 2008. PSG became one of three Intertoto winners after a dominant run which saw them hammer Jazz, Gent and Tavriya Simferopol on their way to the two-legged final. There, they met Roberto Baggio's Brescia, an experienced team also featuring the likes of Pep Guardiola and Luca Toni, which were just 180 minutes away from participating in a major European competition for the first time ever.

For their part, PSG were looking to secure a place in the first round of the UEFA Cup by winning the Intertoto following a mediocre ninth place in the league the previous season. Club legend Luis Fernandez, in his second stint in Paris, was the man who had the difficult task of steering a team full of individual brilliance, which included Argentine defending duo Mauricio Pochettino and Gabriel Heinze, Spanish playmaker Mikel Arteta, Nigerian magician Jay-Jay Okocha and French striker Nicolas Anelka. Future world star Ronaldinho also joined the squad after the summer tournament.

Having breezed through the first three rounds with an aggregate scoreline of 19–2, the Parisians faced their toughest test in the final. In the first leg, PSG and Brescia traded blows in a really entertaining match at the Parc des Princes in Paris but neither side could find a breakthrough. The return leg in Italy was a close affair as well, unravelling late in the second half. Okocha hit the post with a free-kick before Aloísio scored the title-winning goal. The hosts responded almost instantly as Baggio converted a penalty ten minutes from the final whistle but Paris held on to an away-goals victory as Brescia's comeback fell short.

The capital club continued their good form in the 2001–02 UEFA Cup, cruising past Rapid București and Rapid Wien in a bright start to the campaign. Things ultimately ended in disappointment for PSG, however, as the team fell apart because of the players not getting along with Fernandez. They lost on penalties to Rangers in the third round after two goalless legs and only managed an underwhelming fourth place in the league but still good enough to qualify for the UEFA Cup once again.

In the summer, Arteta and Okocha left after receiving better offers, while Anelka was sold due to an ongoing rift with the coach. Ronaldinho was also regularly benched by Fernandez, who accused the Brazilian of being more focused on the city's nightlife than on his football. The result was an even poorer display; PSG finished eleventh in the championship and suffered another early European exit in the 2002–03 UEFA Cup. They easily disposed of Újpest and Național București in the opening two rounds before being eliminated by Boavista on away goals in the third round. Ten-man PSG managed to beat them 2–1 in France but a blooper from goalkeeper Lionel Letizi in the second leg condemned his side. Fernandez got sacked at the end of the season, while the departures of Pochettino and Ronaldinho confirmed the conclusion of a promising team that never fulfilled its full potential.

UEFA Cup / Europa League regular (2003–11)
Paris Saint-Germain made a brief return to the UEFA Champions League in 2004–05. The club's run, however, was a complete disappointment, except for their victory against reigning champions Porto. The Parisians experienced a magical night at the Parc des Princes to record their only win as they finished last in their group. PSG found the net when Charles-Édouard Coridon connected a cross with a scorpion kick from just inside the penalty area to surprise the goalkeeper. Club legend Pauleta doubled the lead barely a minute later for a final score of 2–0. Coridon's acrobatic strike is considered as one of the best goals ever scored in Champions League history.

The capital side improved on their next continental outing, this time getting out of the group stage and reaching the last-16 round in the 2006–07 UEFA Cup. PSG won the first leg against Benfica by 2–1. In the return match, the Portuguese side had gone 2–0 up but Pauleta's strike for Paris threatened to take the tie into extra time. It took a last-minute penalty from Simão to eliminate them. PSG came back stronger in the 2008–09 UEFA Cup. As the bottom side in Group A, they needed to defeat Twente at the Parc des Princes in the final matchday by scoring one more goal than Racing de Santander to grab third place and advance to the last 32.

Péguy Luyindula put PSG in front just eight minutes into the match and Stéphane Sessègnon doubled the lead midway through the first half. Simultaneously, Racing were also winning by the same margin. After the break, Luyindula won a penalty but Mateja Kežman had it saved by the keeper, while Racing scored a third and left Paris on life support. PSG's luck changed in the last ten minutes as Kežman redeemed himself by tapping home a cross and Luyindula followed up immediately with the fourth, feinting to commit the goalie before sliding the ball into the empty net. Racing were not able to score further and Paris leapfrogged them on goals scored.

The Red and Blues then easily dispatched future Bundesliga champions Wolfsburg with a comprehensive 5–1 aggregate success fueled by braces from Guillaume Hoarau and Luyindula. Hoarau was again the protagonist against Braga in the last 16, heading in the only goal of the two legs and sending Paris to the quarter-finals of a major European tournament for the first time since 1997. However, the goals dried up for PSG against Dynamo Kyiv. The French looked the more likely team to score but were unable to break down Dynamo's defence and played out a goalless draw in the opening leg. In Ukraine, helped by a ridiculous own goal and a further blunder from PSG keeper Mickaël Landreau, Dynamo nabbed a convincing 3–0 win to oust the visitors from the competition.

PSG once again looked promising in the 2010–11 UEFA Europa League, known as the UEFA Cup until 2009. After getting rid of Maccabi Tel Aviv in a nine-goal frenzy play-off tie, the French Cup victors were drawn into the group of death, alongside Sevilla, Borussia Dortmund and Karpaty Lviv. Unfazed and driven by a brilliant Nenê, PSG finished the year as Group J winners without losing a single game and deservedly beating closest challengers Sevilla in both games. Paris, however, ran out of gas after the winter break and barely managed to defeat BATE Borisov on away goals thanks to Luyindula's late first-leg equaliser. In a repeat of their 2007 clash, PSG's dreams were cut short by Benfica. Having come from behind to win 2–1 in Lisbon, the Portuguese side scored first at the Parc des Princes and prevented Paris from mimicking their comeback despite Mathieu Bodmer quickly tying the match with a sumptuous volley.

Qatari buyout, Champions League woes (2011–19)
Paris Saint-Germain were transformed into UEFA Champions League contenders in 2011, when they became one of the wealthiest clubs in the world after being purchased by Qatar Sports Investments (QSI). Despite an initial hiccup in 2011–12, in which PSG were eliminated from the UEFA Europa League in the group stage, the club found its footing the following season. Spearheaded by renowned manager Carlo Ancelotti and marquee player Zlatan Ibrahimović during 2012–13, the Red and Blues made their first Champions League appearance since 2004. The club's UCL comeback was deemed a success; PSG edged past Valencia in the last 16, becoming the first French side to win at Mestalla in any UEFA club competition but were unlucky to crash out on away goals against Barcelona in the quarter-finals after drawing both games.

Under new coach Laurent Blanc, PSG endured the same outcome in 2013–14, now against Chelsea. They won 3–1 at home and seemed to have one foot in the semi-finals but bowed out on away goals after losing 2–0 in London. Zlatan Ibrahimović's unstoppable rocket against Anderlecht in the group stage was a highlight, though, being elected as one of the best strikes in the competition's history. Blanc's men gained revenge on Chelsea in 2014–15, eliminating them after extra time. Their joy was short-lived as eventual champions Barcelona outclassed the Parisians in the quarter-finals. The last nail in the coffin for Blanc was the loss to Manchester City in 2015–16. Like the season prior, PSG overcame Chelsea but could not get past City in the quarters.

Fresh from three consecutive UEFA Europa League titles with Sevilla, Unai Emery was hired by the club for his European pedigree in 2016–17. But with Ibrahimović gone in the summer, PSG suffered their most painful continental defeat ever at the hands of Barcelona in the last-16 round. Once more, PSG showed they were capable of being brilliant one day and a complete tragedy the next as they crushed Barca 4–0 in Paris but then surrendered their lead in a humiliating 6–1 loss at the Camp Nou. Known as "La Remontada" ("The Comeback") in football folklore, Barca scored three goals in the final seven minutes as Sergi Roberto's 95th-minute winner secured qualification as well as the greatest comeback in Champions League history.

In the aftermath of the tie, match referee Deniz Aytekin was heavily criticised, particularly for refusing to give PSG a clear penalty when the score was 3–1 and then awarding a dubious second penalty to Barcelona. This game also set in motion Neymar's world record transfer to the French capital a few months later. Journalists have speculated that one reason for him leaving Barca was because media attention focused on teammate Lionel Messi, ignoring Neymar's pivotal role in the win over PSG. In 2017–18, despite now having Neymar as well as Edinson Cavani and Kylian Mbappé up front, they were simply no match for eventual winners Real Madrid. PSG lost both last-16 matches and sealed the end of Emery's tenure.

PSG turned to German coach Thomas Tuchel in 2018–19. Poised to reach the quarters for the first time since 2016, the Ligue 1 champions relinquished yet another first-leg victory to slip out on away goals. Goals from Presnel Kimpembe and Mbappé made PSG the first French team to beat Manchester United at Old Trafford in any European competition (2–0) but were then stunned in Paris. Kimpembe, one of the heroes in Manchester, turned into the villain when the ball struck him on the arm inside the penalty area in the dying seconds of the match. The referee consulted VAR and awarded the penalty. Marcus Rashford converted it and United won 3–1, effectively eliminating PSG with another embarrassing comeback.

Champions League final and semi-finals (2019–2021)

Paris Saint-Germain were finally able to break their UEFA Champions League hoodoo in 2019–20. Without stars Neymar, Edinson Cavani and Kylian Mbappé, the Parisians battered Real Madrid 3–0 with a brace from Ángel Di María in their opening group fixture and paved the way for topping Group A. PSG were drawn with Borussia Dortmund and their old demons resurfaced. A poor team performance saw Paris lose 2–1 in Germany, leaving them on the brink of a fourth consecutive last-16 elimination. But Thomas Tuchel's team stepped up in the return leg as Neymar scored the first goal and led PSG to the quarter-finals with a 2–0 victory over Dortmund at an empty Parc des Princes because of the COVID-19 pandemic.

Due to the impact of the coronavirus outbreak, the Champions League was put on hold until August 2020, when it resumed as a straight knockout competition in Lisbon. Seen by many as an easy draw, Atalanta made Paris sweat on the day of their 50th anniversary. The Italian debutants scored first and were within a few minutes of the last four against a misfiring PSG side. Neymar, who had missed two clear chances, and Mbappé ignited a thrilling late comeback to send Paris through to the UCL semi-finals for the first time since 1995. The Brazilian assisted fellow countryman Marquinhos for the equaliser in the 90th minute, while Mbappé teed up unlikely hero Eric Maxim Choupo-Moting for the last-gasp winner.

RB Leipzig were PSG's next adversary. This time, however, there was no room for surprises. The Red and Blues were on top from the start, killing off the game before the hour mark with goals from Marquinhos, Di María and Juan Bernat to reach their first Champions League final. They faced German giants Bayern Munich in a tightly contested affair. PSG had their chances but their finishing was not at its best. First, Neymar was denied by Bayern keeper Manuel Neuer and, then, Mbappé's miss at the end of the opening period proved to be a turning point. Bayern were the better side in the second half and punished them early on through PSG Academy graduate Kingsley Coman, who headed the only goal of the game.

Drawn into the group of death, PSG had a shaky start to the 2020–21 campaign. They fell to Manchester United in their opening match (their first home defeat at this stage since 2004), won against Başakşehir and were defeated by Leipzig. With elimination looming, Neymar's six goals in their next three victories allowed them to narrowly top the group, notably getting back at United for 2019 by winning at Old Trafford (3–1) and ousting them from the competition. Now with Mauricio Pochettino on the bench, following Tuchel's dismissal, PSG also exacted revenge for 2017's "La Remontada" by becoming the first French side to win at the Camp Nou in the UCL and the second to do so after Metz in the 1984 Cup Winners' Cup. Paris ripped Barcelona apart in Spain with a Kylian Mbappé hat-trick (4–1), before Keylor Navas prevented any chance of another second-leg collapse to reach the quarter-finals (1–1).

PSG were pitted against title holders Bayern Munich in a rematch of last year's final. The Bavarians dominated the first leg, but Paris were the more clinical side and clinched a 3–2 win at the Allianz Arena. Mbappé scored twice, Neymar recorded two assists and Navas made several saves as PSG became the first French team to defeat Bayern in the UCL knockout stages since Saint-Étienne in 1969. In the second leg, man of the match Neymar failed to put it away with his numerous chances but hosts PSG still advanced to the last four on away goals despite losing 1–0. Against Manchester City at home, PSG took the lead through Marquinhos after a great first-half display but collapsed in the second, as City capitalised on two serious mistakes from Paris to turn the match around (1–2). The Citizens then secured their place in the final with a commanding victory at the Etihad Stadium (2–0).

Back to square one (2021–present)
Paris Saint-Germain were back to square one in 2021–22. Despite a better head-to-head record, they were beaten to top spot in Group A by Manchester City. Mauricio Pochettino's men came out on top at the Parc des Princes, featuring Lionel Messi's first PSG goal (2–0), but squandered Kylian Mbappé's opener and lost in England (1–2). PSG's undoing, however, were their underwhelming draws against Club Brugge and RB Leipzig. Winning either of these two matches would have taken their final tally from 11 to 13 and above City. The Red and Blues were drawn against Real Madrid in the last-16 round, where they self-destructed for the fourth time in six seasons. Having handed Paris a slender advantage with a late goal in the first leg (1–0), Mbappé struck again in Madrid to put them two up with less than 30 minutes to play. Then PSG collapsed, letting in three goals in 17 minutes (1–3).

2022–23 played out in similar fashion as PSG missed out on topping Group H. Having drawn both of their meetings 1–1, Paris and Benfica finished level on points, head to head, goal difference, and goals scored. The Portuguese side ultimately edged PSG for top spot because they scored more away goals. On a positive note, the Parisians started the campaign by beating Juventus 2–1 at home. Kylian Mbappé's brace sealed their first-ever victory against the Italians in nine meetings, having lost the last six. They would also later claim the three points in Turin by the same scoreline. Another highlight was their 7–2 home win over Maccabi Haifa, which equalled their record of goals scored in a European game. Drawn against Bayern Munich in the round of 16, PSG showed their limits yet again as they crashed out 3–0 on aggregate. This was their fifth elimination at that stage in the last seven years.

Records

As of 8 March 2023. Overall record in UEFA competitions.

Club
Record home win: 7–1.
(vs. Gent, UEFA Intertoto Cup, 1 August 2001).
(vs. Celtic, UEFA Champions League, 22 November 2017).
Record away win: 5–0.
(vs. Anderlecht, UEFA Champions League, 23 October 2013).
(vs. Malmö FF, UEFA Champions League, 25 November 2015).
(vs. Celtic, UEFA Champions League, 12 September 2017).
(vs. Club Brugge, UEFA Champions League, 22 October 2019).
Record home defeat: 1–6 (vs. Juventus, UEFA Super Cup, 15 January 1997).
Record away defeat: 1–6 (vs. Barcelona, UEFA Champions League, 8 March 2017).
Longest winning run: 8 matches.
Longest unbeaten run: 19 matches.
Longest unbeaten home run: 33 matches.
Most goals scored in a season: 27 in the 2017–18 UEFA Champions League.
Fewest goals conceded in a season: 2 in the 2002–03 UEFA Cup.
Highest home attendance: 49,575 (vs. Waterschei, UEFA Cup Winners' Cup, 13 March 1983).
Lowest home attendance: 9,117 (vs. Karpaty Lviv, UEFA Europa League, 30 September 2010).

Personnel
Most decorated president: 1 title – Michel Denisot and Laurent Perpère.
Most decorated manager: 2 titles – Luis Fernandez.
Most matches managed: 46 matches – Luis Fernandez.
Most matches won: 30 wins – Luis Fernandez.

Players
Most appearances: 81 – Marquinhos.
Most clean sheets: 23 – Bernard Lama.
Most goals: 34 – Kylian Mbappé.
Most goals in a season: 10 – Zlatan Ibrahimović in the 2013–14 UEFA Champions League.
Most goals in a match: 4 – Zlatan Ibrahimović (vs. Anderlecht, UEFA Champions League, 23 October 2013).
Most assists: 23 – Kylian Mbappé.
Most assists in a season: 7 – Zlatan Ibrahimović in the 2012–13 UEFA Champions League.
Most assists in a match: 4.
Leonardo (vs. Steaua București, UEFA Champions League, 27 August 1997).
Zlatan Ibrahimović (vs. Dinamo Zagreb, UEFA Champions League, 6 November 2012).

Statistics

As of 14 February 2023.

Honours

 
  shared record

Finals
Matches won after regular time (90 minutes of play) or extra-time (aet) are highlighted in green, while losses are highlighted in red. Matches that ended in a draw are highlighted in yellow. Matches won by either team after a penalty shootout (p) are also highlighted in yellow and count as draws for statistical purposes.

By season

By competition

Award winners

France Football

Ballon d'Or (1)
 Lionel Messi – 2021.

Kopa Trophy (1)
 Kylian Mbappé – 2018.

Yashin Trophy (1)
 Gianluigi Donnarumma – 2021.

African Footballer of the Year (1)
 George Weah – 1994.

FIFA

The Best FIFA Men's Player (1)
 Lionel Messi –  2022.

Tuttosport
Golden Boy (1)
 Kylian Mbappé – 2017.

UEFA Champions League
 UEFA Champions League Top Scorer (1)
 George Weah in 1994–95.

 UEFA Champions League Assist Leader (2)
 Zlatan Ibrahimović in 2012–13.
 Ángel Di María in 2019–20.

Notes

See also
List of Paris Saint-Germain F.C. records and statistics
List of Paris Saint-Germain F.C. seasons

References

External links
Official websites
PSG.FR - Site officiel du Paris Saint-Germain
Paris Saint-Germain - Ligue 1
Paris Saint-Germain - UEFA.com

Paris Saint-Germain F.C. in international football
Paris Saint-Germain F.C.